Lake Arrowhead is a private community and census-designated place (CDP) in Clinton County, Missouri, United States. It is in the southeastern part of the county, surrounding a lake of the same name. It is served by the Lathrop post office.

Lake Arrowhead was first listed as a CDP prior to the 2020 census.

The subdivision is operated and managed by the Lake Arrowhead Property Owners Association, consisting of all owners in good standing, who elect a volunteer Board of Trustees. There are 2,058 total lots in the subdivision.

Geography 
The terrain is hilly and tree-covered, with large grassy areas on the west side.

Interstate 35 forms the eastern edge of the community, and Missouri Route 33 runs north-south less than one mile west of the community. The subdivision has lakes, ponds, boating, fishing, beaches, swimming, picnic areas, camping lots, a community center, rentals, and residential homes. There is no commercial development company active at the subdivision.

Demographics

Lakes 
All boats require a current decal. A Missouri fishing permit is required.

There are three lakes varying in size:

Lake Arrowhead is the largest. It has three boat ramps, two docks, one beach and four public use areas.
Spring Lake is a mid-sized fishing lake, offering two public use areas with two beaches. Small fishing boats with under 10 hp motors are allowed.
Aspen Lake is the smallest lake offering a public use area with swimming beach. No motorized boats are allowed.

Community property 
The homeowners association owns and maintains considerable common areas around the lakes for use by its property owners in good standing. The association maintains  of gravel roads. Just inside by the main gate is the Community Building, which can be reserved for a variety of functions.

Camping 
Camper trailers, tents, and RVs are allowed in the subdivision homeowners' own lots only. There are no public use campgrounds, showers, or restrooms located within the subdivision.

Education 

The community is served by two school districts.

Northside - Lathrop R-II School District
Southside - Kearney R-1 School District

References 

 Lake Arrowhead - USGS - GNIS
 Lake Arrowhead Dam - USGS - GNIS
 Spring Lake - USGS - GNIS
 Spring Lake Dam - USGS - GNIS
 U.S. Census Bureau

External links 
Lake Arrowhead
Lake Arrowhead POA facebook

Census-designated places in Clinton County, Missouri
Census-designated places in Missouri